Draconectes narinosus is a species of troglobitic stone loach known only from a cave on Van Gio Island in Halong Bay, Vietnam.  This species is the only known member of its genus.

References
 

Cave fish
Nemacheilidae

Fish described in 2012